Plaxtol is a village and civil parish in the borough of Tonbridge and Malling in Kent, England. In the 2011 Census, the parish had a population of 1,117.

The name Plaxtol is believed to be derived from Old English words meaning "play area"; there used to be a large green in the middle of the village where children would play after attending church on a Sunday.

The River Bourne flows through the parish, and formerly powered three watermills in Plaxtol – Winfield Mill (corn), Longmill (corn) and Roughway Paper Mill. The village has a primary school, a Cromwellian church, a village shop, a pottery school and a pub; it also once had a bakery and a butcher.

The 1,000-acre Fairlawne Estate adjoining the village of Shipbourne was owned by Sir Henry Vane the Elder, in the 17th century, and was owned by the Cazalet family in the 19th century. Major Peter Cazalet was a trainer of horses owned by Queen Elizabeth The Queen Mother who was an occasional guest. The estate is currently owned by the Saudi Arabian horse-breeder Prince Khalid ibn Abdullah.

Notable residents
Walter Monckton, 1st Viscount Monckton of Brenchley was born in Plaxtol in 1891. His father was a paper manufacturer in the village.
The teacher and theatre director Richard Tomlinson lived in the village in the 1990s.
Air Chief Marshal Sir Lewis Hodges died in Plaxtol in 2007.
The Broad family have also frequented the area since the 1700s, most notably Lord Lawrence Broad 1st (1712-1789) who is reported to have owned the largest poultry farm in West Kent of that time up until his death where his widow Lady Alison (1723-1803); sold the estate onto the Attwood family.
Lady Natalie Attwood (1951-  ), although no longer living in the village, still visits occasionally and in 2004 financed the renovation of the local church's clock tower. The church's cemetery contains her ancestors.

References

External links

Plaxtol village website

Villages in Kent